Pierre Boutron (born 11 November 1947 in Portugal) is a French actor and director. He was married to actress Magali Renoir.

Biography
Pierre Boutron is a well-known TV director. His Des enfants dans les arbres or Les Faux-fuyants was a great success. His adaptation of Le Silence de la mer by Vercors was also a success. In 2006, he made a political film for Canal+ with Le Rainbow Warrior. While most of his work has been for television, Boutron has produced four feature films, including  in 1988.

Theater

Actor

Director

Filmography

References

External links
 Pierre BOUTRON on Agence artistique
 Pierre Boutron on Comme au cinéma
 Pierre Boutron on AlloCiné
 

1947 births
Living people
French film directors
French male actors
French theatre directors
French people of Portuguese descent